The 110th Infantry division of German Army (Wehrmacht) was formed in April 1940 in Lüneburg under the 11. Armee and was commanded by Generalleutnant Ernst Seifert. Until June 1941 and the commencement of Operation Barbarossa on the 22nd day of that month, it was stationed in Poland. It fought on the Eastern Front as part of Army Group Centre, VI Corps and had, by the end of the war, nine Knight's Cross of the Iron Cross holders, four of whom received their awards in November 1943. The division was destroyed by Soviet forces in July 1944. The division itself consisted of three infantry regiments and an artillery regiment.

Commanding officers
Generalleutnant Ernst Seifert, 10 December 1940 – 24 January 1942
Generalleutnant Martin Gilbert, 1 February 1942 – 1 June 1943
Generalleutnant Eberhard von Kurowski, 1 June 1943 – 25 September 1943
Generalleutnant Albrecht Wüstenhagen, 25 September 1943 – 1 December 1943
Generalleutnant Eberhard von Kurowski, 1 December 1943 – 11 May 1944
Generalmajor Gustav Gihr, 11 May 1944 – 15 May 1944
Generalleutnant Eberhard von Kurowski, 15 May 1944 – July 1944

References 

Military units and formations established in 1940
Infantry divisions of Germany during World War II
Military units and formations disestablished in 1944